Chesterfield Royal Hospital is an acute general hospital in Chesterfield, Derbyshire. It is managed by the Chesterfield Royal Hospital NHS Foundation Trust.

History
The hospital has its origins in a dispensary established in a small house in St. Mary's Gate in 1854. The foundation stone for a new purpose-built facility was laid by the Marquis of Hartington on the site of Durrant Hall in 1859. The new hospital was officially opened in 1860: this facility became the Chesterfield Royal Hospital in 1918 and a nurses' home was added in 1919 before it joined the National Health Service in 1948.

A new modern hospital at Calow opened to patients on 29 April 1984. It was officially opened by the Queen in 1985 and was extended to include a maternity and gynaecology unit in 1989.

The National Gardens Scheme Macmillan Unit opened in November 2018. The two-storey building has 21 chemotherapy treatment chairs, two treatment beds, and three treatment rooms. It was built by Vinci Construction.

Notable births
People born at the hospital include Thomas Raymond Latimer, a professional wrestler currently based in the United States where he performs under the ring name Bram.

References

External links
Chesterfield Royal Hospital NHS Foundation Trust

Hospitals in Derbyshire
NHS hospitals in England
Buildings and structures in Chesterfield, Derbyshire